Martin Máša (born August 10, 1974) is a Czech ice hockey left winger who plays for Bracknell Bees in the English Premier Ice Hockey League. He has previously played for teams in France, England, Czech Republic, and North America.

Trivia
Fellow countryman Lukas Smital has skated on six different teams with Máša: 1996-99 Johnstown Chiefs; 1997-98 Saint John Flames; 2000-01 Greensboro Generals; 2003-04 Texas Wildcatters; 2004-05 Bracknell Bees; 2009–2011 Guildford Flames; 2011–present Bracknell Bees;

Career statistics

Awards
 Kelly Cup winner, 2001-02 (Greenville Grrrowl)
 Winter Cup winner, 2004-05 (Bracknell Bees)
 Magnus Cup winner, 2006-07 (Brûleurs de Loups)
 Magnus Cup winner, 2008-09 (Brûleurs de Loups)
 English Cup winner, 2009-10 (Guildford Flames)
 EPIHL Playoff winner, 2010-11 (Guildford Flames)

External links
 

1974 births
Living people
Bracknell Bees players
Brûleurs de Loups players
Czech ice hockey left wingers
Fort Worth Fire players
Greensboro Generals players
Greenville Grrrowl players
Guildford Flames players
HC Kometa Brno players
Johnstown Chiefs players
Kansas City Blades players
Kelowna Spartans players
Knoxville Cherokees players
Louisiana IceGators (ECHL) players
Providence Bruins players
Orlando Solar Bears (IHL) players
Saint John Flames players
Sheffield Steelers players
Springfield Falcons players
Texas Wildcatters players
People from Sokolov
Sportspeople from the Karlovy Vary Region
Czech expatriate ice hockey players in the United States
Czech expatriate ice hockey players in Canada
Expatriate ice hockey players in France
Czech expatriate sportspeople in France
Czech expatriate sportspeople in England
Expatriate ice hockey players in England